Dollar Tree, Inc., is an American multi-price-point chain of discount variety stores. Headquartered in Chesapeake, Virginia, it is a Fortune 500 company and operates 15,115 stores throughout the 48 contiguous U.S. states and Canada. Its stores are supported by a nationwide logistics network of 24 distribution centers. Additionally, the company operates stores under the name of Dollar Bills, as well as a multi-price-point variety chain under the Family Dollar banner.

Dollar Tree competes in the dollar store and low-end retail markets. Each Dollar Tree stocks a variety of products, including national, regional, and private-label brands. Departments found in a Dollar Tree store include health and beauty, food and snacks, party, seasonal décor, housewares, glassware, dinnerware, household cleaning supplies, candy, toys, gifts, gift bags and wrap, stationery, craft supplies, teaching supplies, automotive, electronics, pet supplies, and books. Most Dollar Tree stores also sell frozen foods and dairy items such as milk, eggs, pizza, ice cream, frozen dinners, and pre-made baked goods. In August 2012, the company began accepting manufacturer coupons at all of its store locations.

Most of their stores are located in the South and Northeast but they can be found scattered across all regions of the United States.

History

Early years
In 1953, K. R. Perry opened a Ben Franklin variety store in Norfolk, Virginia, which later became known as K&K 5&10.

In 1970, K. R. Perry, Doug Perry, and Macon Brock started K&K Toys in Norfolk, Virginia. This mall concept grew to over 130 stores on the East Coast.

In 1986, Doug Perry, Macon Brock, and Ray Compton started another chain store called Only $1.00 with five stores, one in Georgia, one in Tennessee, and three in Virginia. The expansion of dollar stores was continued alongside K&K Toys stores, mostly in enclosed malls.

On April 27, 1989, the first “Dollar Tree”-branded store opened at the Jessamine Mall in Sumter, South Carolina. In a May 1989 advertisement in the Sun-News, the fledgling chain, apparently already planning 100 stores for the eastern United States, bills the dollar-pricing model as the “hottest new shopping concept in America”.

1990s
In 1991, the corporation made a decision to focus exclusively on the expansion of dollar stores after selling K&K stores to KB Toys, owned by Melville Corporation.

In 1993, the name Only $1.00 was changed to Dollar Tree Stores to address what could be a multi-price-point strategy in the future, and part equity interest was sold to SKM partners, a private equity firm.

Brock and the co-founders of Dollar Tree got the idea for the company from another retailer known as Everything's A Dollar, which went bankrupt in the 1990s.

On March 6, 1995, Dollar Tree, Inc. went public on the NASDAQ exchange at $15 a share, with a market cap then calculated at $225 million.

In 1996, Dollar Tree acquired Dollar Bill$, Inc., a Chicago-based chain of 136 stores.

In 1997, the company opened its first distribution center and its new store support center, both located in Chesapeake, Virginia.

In 1998, Dollar Tree acquired 98-Cent Clearance Centers in California.

In 1999, Dollar Tree acquired Only $One stores based in New York. That same year, the company opened its second distribution center in Olive Branch, Mississippi.

2000s

In 2000, Dollar Tree acquired Dollar Express, a Philadelphia-based company, and also built a new distribution center in Stockton, California. In 2001, the company opened two additional distribution centers, in Savannah, Georgia, and Briar Creek, Pennsylvania. In 2003, Dollar Tree acquired Salt Lake City, Utah-based Greenbacks, Inc., and opened a new distribution center in Marietta, Oklahoma.

In 2004, Dollar Tree opened its first store in North Dakota which marked its operation of stores in all 48 contiguous states. The company also opened new distribution centers in Joliet, Illinois, and Ridgefield, Washington.

In 2006, Dollar Tree celebrated its 20th year of retailing at a $1.00 price point, opened its 3,000th store, and acquired 138 DEAL$ stores, previously owned by SUPERVALU INC.

In 2007, Dollar Tree expanded its Briar Creek Distribution Center and crossed the $4 billion sales threshold. In 2008, Dollar Tree earned a place in the Fortune 500. By the close of 2009, the company opened a store in Washington, D.C., and purchased a new distribution center in San Bernardino, California.

In 2009, Dollar Tree redesigned its website with a new e-commerce platform. DollarTree.com sells Dollar Tree merchandise in larger quantities to individuals, small businesses, and organizations. The company also advertises in-store events, specials, seasonal promotions, and featured products through the site, and users can locate a retail store, research information about Dollar Tree, and view product recalls. Dollar Tree also added customer ratings and reviews, and customer stories to the site.

2010s

In 2010, the corporation opened its 4,000th chain store and acquired 86 Canadian Dollar Giant stores which are based in Vancouver, British Columbia, Canada. The stores are operated in British Columbia, Alberta, Saskatchewan and Ontario. These are the first retail locations outside of the United States operated by Dollar Tree.

In 2011, Dollar Tree achieved total sales of $6.63 billion, opened 278 new stores, and completed a  expansion of its distribution center in Savannah, Georgia.

In 2012, Dollar Tree opened another 345 new stores and exceeded $7 billion in sales, with an end-of-the-year market cap at $9.13 billion.

On July 28, 2014, Dollar Tree announced that it was offering $9.2 billion for the purchase of competitor chain store Family Dollar. On August 18, 2014, Dollar General lodged a competing bid of $9.7 billion for Family Dollar. The bid was rejected on August 20, 2014, by the Family Dollar board, which said it would proceed with the deal with Dollar Tree.

In January 2015, Dollar Tree announced plans to divest 300 stores in order to appease US regulators scrutinizing its proposed takeover of Family Dollar stores.

In June 2015, the firm agreed to sell 330 stores to private equity company Sycamore Partners as part of the approval process for its $8.5 billion takeover of Family Dollar.

The company was ranked 134 on the 2018 Fortune 500 list of the United States corporations by revenue.

In March 2019, as part of its reposition plan, Dollar Tree announced that it will close up to 390 Family Dollar stores along with renovating 1,000 other locations.

2020s

On March 3, 2021, it was announced that Dollar Tree had quietly introduced a combination Family Dollar/Dollar Tree store concept, with the first one opening in early 2021. Dollar Tree has opened and operated nearly 50 locations by the end of 2020, primarily in small towns with populations of just a few thousand people.

On September 28, 2021, CEO Michael Witynski, citing increased shipping and labor costs squeezing profit margins, announced that some prices will be rising above $1, possibly to as much as $1.50.

On November 23, 2021, it was announced that Dollar Tree plans to raise its prices from a dollar for typical items to $1.25 in response to inflation and pressure from investors to raise prices. Some of the items sold at Dollar Tree will not have their prices increased. The retailer will introduce the new price point in more than 2,000 stores by December 2021 and complete the roll-out across most of its 8,000 stores by the first quarter of 2022.

Business strategy
Dollar Tree is classified as an extreme discount store. It claims to be able to achieve this because their buyers "work extremely hard to find the best bargains out there", and it has "great control over the tremendous buying power at the dollar price-point". Its prices are primarily designed to attract financially disadvantaged customers, but it has also become popular within immigrant communities.

Family Dollar bidding
On July 28, 2014, Dollar Tree announced that a deal had been reached and approved by both parties to purchase Family Dollar for $8.5 billion plus acquisition of the $1 billion in debt currently held by Family Dollar. The deal came in the month following activist investor and major shareholder Carl Icahn's demand that Family Dollar be promptly put up for sale. After their reported deal had been struck, Dollar General entered the bidding, surpassing Dollar Tree's offer, with a $9.7 billion bid on August 18, 2014. On August 20, 2014, Family Dollar rejected the Dollar General bid, saying it was not a matter of price, but concerns over antitrust issues that had convinced the company and its advisers that the deal could not be concluded on the terms proposed. The Family Dollar board had been analyzing potential antitrust issues that could arise from doing a deal with Dollar General, since the start of the year a statement from CEO Howard Levine outlined.

Canada

Dollar Tree stores in Canada sell items for C$1.50 or less. On October 11, 2010, Dollar Tree announced its acquisition of Dollar Giant, incorporated in 2001 in Vancouver, Canada, for $52 million. At the time of the acquisition, Dollar Giant had about 85 retail outlets in the provinces of British Columbia, Alberta, Saskatchewan and Ontario. Approximately 30 of its retail locations are in British Columbia, making it the second largest dollar store chain in that province. It was Canada's fourth largest operator of dollar stores. Dollar Tree has since rebranded all of its Dollar Giant stores to Dollar Tree; these were the first retail locations outside of the United States operated by Dollar Tree. The company now operates 227 stores across Canada, concentrated in Western Canada and Ontario. Dollar Tree Canada's merchandising team is located in Mississauga, Ontario, while its corporate office remains in Burnaby in Greater Vancouver.

Recalls
The Consumer Product Safety Commission lists several recalls for products sold at Dollar Tree stores. The recalled products include salsa jars with broken glass inside them, hot-melt mini glue guns (recalled in January 2008) which could short circuit and cause burns, and candle sets (recalled in February 2004) which could produce excessive flame.

References

External links

 

Chesapeake, Virginia
Discount stores of the United States
Retail companies established in 1986
Variety stores
Private equity portfolio companies
Companies based in Virginia
Companies listed on the Nasdaq
1986 establishments in Virginia
American companies established in 1986
1995 initial public offerings